Jean-Luc Escayol (born February 11, 1972 in Perpignan, France) is a footballer currently playing for Division d'Honneur club Port-la-Nouvelle. He plays as a defensive midfielder.

See also
Football in France
List of football clubs in France

References

External links
Jean-Luc Escayol profile at chamoisfc79.fr

1974 births
Living people
French footballers
Association football midfielders
Le Mans FC players
US Créteil-Lusitanos players
Chamois Niortais F.C. players
FC Sète 34 players
Ligue 2 players
Wasquehal Football players